The Gavazzi Riots were disturbances created in Quebec and Montreal in June 1853 by mobs which attacked halls in which ex-Catholic monk Alessandro Gavazzi was lecturing.

Overview 

During the spring of 1853 Alessandro Gavazzi, an Italian patriot, visited North America. His lectures at Quebec and Montreal were strongly anti-Catholic; and at both places soldiers had to be called out to restore order. The riots also caused political repercussions.

Riot in Quebec City 

On the evening of the June 6th, pursuant to previous announcement, Gavazzi proceeded to deliver a discourse in the Free Presbyterian Church, in St. Ursule Street, on the subject of the Inquisition. A large audience assembled to hear him. When he had been speaking for somewhat more than an hour he was interrupted by violent and abusive exclamations. The interruption was the signal for action on the part of other protestors outside. A volley of stones came crashing through the windows of the church, and immediately afterwards a crowd of persons armed with bludgeons made a forcible entrance into the building. 

The principal participants were Irish Catholics who reacted violently to Gavazzi's anti-Catholic sentiments. Gavazzi attributed the failure of the Italian national movement of 1848-49 to the defection of Pope Pius IX from the cause, and therefore rejected Catholicism. The Gavazzi Riot in Quebec was quelled by military forces. 

In February 1854, on acquittal of a Quebec rioter, Gavazzi was burned in effigy.

Riot in Montreal 

On June 9, a much more serious affray occurred at Montreal, in consequence of the delivery of a lecture there by Gavazzi. The place of delivery was Zion Church, Haymarket Square.  A strong body of police were stationed opposite the church. While the lecture was in progress there was an attempt on the part of a band of Roman Catholic Irish to force their way into the church. A few minutes afterwards the latter returned to the assault, and were again driven back. Charles Wilson, the mayor of the city, ordered the troops to fire upon the crowd. The order was obeyed, and five men fell dead. The firing by the troops put an end to aggression on the part of the mob. It is impossible even to approximate the number of the wounded. 

Investigation of the riot proceeds at Montreal on June 26. The coroner's report deflected blame from Mayor Wilson.

Protestant journalists such as John Dougall of the Montreal Witness persisted in accusing the mayor for the riots. 

The Montrealer painter James D. Duncan depicts the event in his work "Gavazzi riot" (1853).

Notes

Further reading
 Aspinwall, Bernard. "Rev. Alessandro Gavazzi (1808–1889) and Scottish Identity: A Chapter in Nineteenth Century Anti-Catholicism." Recusant History 28#1 (2006): 129-152.
 Horner, Dan. "" Shame upon you as men!": Contesting Authority in the Aftermath of Montreal's Gavazzi Riot." Histoire sociale/social history 44.1 (2011): 29-52.

External links 
 The Gavazzi Riots and their Consequences
 Extensive resources on the Gavazzi riots

1853 riots
Riots and civil disorder in Canada
History of Montreal
History of Quebec City 
1853 in Canada
Sectarian violence
1853 in Quebec
Anti-Protestantism
1850s crimes in Canada